In basketball, a rebound is the act of gaining possession of the ball after a missed field goal or free throw. An offensive rebound occurs when a player recovers the ball after their own or a teammate's missed shot attempt, while a defensive rebound occurs when a player recovers the ball after an opponent's missed shot attempt. The VTB United League's rebounding title is awarded to the player with the highest rebounds per game average in a given regular season.

Rebounding leaders

References

External links
 VTB United League Official Website 
 VTB United League Official Website 

VTB United League statistical leaders